The 2004 Atlantic Hockey Men's Ice Hockey Tournament was the inaugural Atlantic Hockey Men's Ice Hockey Tournament. It was played between March 12 and March 20, 2004. All games were played at the Tate Rink in West Point, New York, the home venue of the Army Black Knights. By winning the tournament, Holy Cross received the Atlantic Hockey Association's automatic bid to the 2004 NCAA Division I Men's Ice Hockey Tournament, the first appearance in team history.

Format
The tournament featured three rounds of play and a play-in game. All games in the tournament are single-elimination. The play-in game consists of the eighth and ninth seeds competing to decide the final qualifier. In the quarterfinals, the first seed plays the winner of the play-in game while the second and seventh seeds, the third and sixth seeds and the fourth and fifth seeds play to determine who advances to the semifinals. of the four remaining teams, the highest and lowest remaining ranked teams play each other with the other two teams facing one another to determine the championship participants. The tournament champion receives an automatic bid to the 2004 NCAA Men's Division I Ice Hockey Tournament.

Conference standings
Note: GP = Games played; W = Wins; L = Losses; T = Ties; PTS = Points; GF = Goals For; GA = Goals Against

Bracket
Teams are reseeded after the Quarterfinals

Note: * denotes overtime period(s)

Play-In

(8) Army vs. (9) American International

Quarterfinals

(1) Holy Cross vs. (9) American International

(2) Mercyhurst vs. (7) Bentley

(3) Quinnipiac vs. (6) Canisius

(4) Sacred Heart vs. (5) Connecticut

Semifinals

(1) Holy Cross vs. (6) Canisius

(2) Mercyhurst vs. (4) Sacred Heart

Championship

(1) Holy Cross vs. (4) Sacred Heart

Tournament awards

All-Tournament Team
G Tony Quesada (Holy Cross)
D Konn Hawkes (Sacred Heart)
D R. J. Irving (Holy Cross)
F Pierre-Luc O'Brien (Sacred Heart)
F Greg Kealey* (Holy Cross)
F Jeff Dams (Holy Cross)
* Most Valuable Player(s)

References

Aha tournament
Atlantic Hockey Tournament